Jews' Court is a Grade I listed building on Steep Hill in Lincoln, England. It houses the headquarters of the Society for Lincolnshire History and Archaeology.

Jews' Court is located immediately above Jew's House on Steep Hill. The three-storeyed stone building dates from  but was altered in the 18th century and the windows were replaced in the early-19th and 20th centuries. The Jews' Court may contain some late medieval stonework but a recent architectural survey has shown that there is very little medieval stonework above basement level in the existing building. Historian Cecil Roth believed it to be the site of a medieval synagogue. Documentary evidence of 1290 when the Jewish community of Lincoln was expelled shows that the Jews' Court has always been divided into two houses, and a charter of 1316 mentions that a Jewish scola or synagogue had stood to the west in the tenement behind these two houses.

In 1910, a well was dug in the basement of the building; the owner subsequently claimed that this was where the body of Little Saint Hugh of Lincoln had been found and charged people to see it.

By the early-20th century the property had been sub-divided into cheap accommodation. It was bought by Lincoln City Council in 1924 and in 1928 it was proposed to be demolished under a slum clearance order. Lincolnshire Architectural and Archaeological Society (a predecessor of the Society for Lincolnshire History and Archaeology) objected to the proposed demolition and were given the building by the city council on condition it was refurbished. It is now owned by the charity the Jews' Court and Bardney Abbey Trust. The Society for Lincolnshire History and Archaeology has its headquarters at Jews' Court and the building includes a lecture room and bookshop.

The Lincolnshire Jewish Community, which is affiliated with Liberal Judaism, in 1992 began holding Shabbat and High Holy Day services at Jews' Court; one of the services was filmed in the TV series The Story of the Jews by Simon Schama.

See also

Bardney Abbey 
Jew's House
Norman House ("Aaron the Jew's House")
St Mary's Guildhall, Lincoln

References

Sources
Johnson C. (2015) Jews' Court: Truth and Legend in Walker A. (ed), Lincoln City Centre North of the River Witham in the Survey of Lincoln Vol.1.
Johnson C. and Jones S. (2016) Steep, Strait and High: Ancient Houses of Central Lincoln. Lincoln Record Society, Boydell & Brewer, Woodbridge
Lincolnshire Jewish Community, BBC Lincolnshire, 28 October 2014
Hutchinson Concise Encyclopedia: Lincoln

External links
 Lincoln's Medieval Jewish Community on Jewish Communities and Records – UK (hosted by jewishgen.org).

12th-century synagogues
Buildings and structures in Lincoln, England
Grade I listed buildings in Lincolnshire
History of Lincoln, England
Medieval synagogues in England
Norman architecture in England